A LED is a light-emitting diode. (light source)

LED or Led may also refer to:
 LED (editor), a programmers' editor by Norsk Data
 Led (river), a river in northern Russia
 L.E.D., former stage name of Skydiver Elley Duhé
 Ledbury railway station's National Rail station code
 Local economic development, an approach to development, particularly in the Third World
 Pulkovo Airport's IATA airport code in St. Petersburg (former Leningrad), Russia

See also

 L. Ed., an unofficial reporter of Supreme Court of the US opinions
 Lead, a chemical element
 LED lamp or LED light bulb
 Led Zeppelin, an English rock band